Di María (or Di Maria) is a surname. Notable people with the surname include:

Ángel Di María (born 1988), Argentine footballer
Francesco di Maria (1623–1690), Italian painter
Tommaso di Maria Allery Monterosato (1841–1927), Italian malacologist